Turn: Washington's Spies (originally titled Turn and stylized as TURИ: Washington's Spies) is an American period drama television series based on Alexander Rose's book Washington's Spies: The Story of America's First Spy Ring (2007), a history of the Culper Ring. The series originally aired on the AMC network for four seasons, from April 6, 2014, to August 12, 2017.

Plot
The story covers events from 1776 to 1781 and features a farmer from Setauket, New York, and his childhood friends. They form an unlikely group of spies called the Culper Ring, which eventually helps to turn the tide during the American Revolutionary War. The series begins in October 1776, shortly after British victories recapture Long Island and the Port of New York for the Crown, and leave General George Washington's army in dire straits. The first episode opens with the following introductory text:

Autumn 1776. Insurgents have declared war against the Crown. Following a successful naval landing, His Majesty's Army has forced Washington's rebels into the wilderness. New York City serves as military base of operations for the British. The Loyalists of nearby Long Island keep vigilant watch out for sympathizers and spies.

Cast

Main cast
 Jamie Bell as Abraham Woodhull
 Seth Numrich as Captain Benjamin Tallmadge
 Daniel Henshall as Lieutenant Caleb Brewster
 Heather Lind as Anna Strong
 Meegan Warner as Mary Woodhull
 Burn Gorman as Major Edmund Hewlett (based on Richard Hewlett)
 Samuel Roukin as Captain John Graves Simcoe
 Kevin R. McNally as Judge Richard Woodhull
 Angus Macfadyen as Major Robert Rogers (seasons 1–3; special appearance 4)
 JJ Feild as Major John André (seasons 1–3)
 Ksenia Solo as Peggy Shippen (seasons 2–4)
 Ian Kahn as General George Washington (recurring season 1, main seasons 2–4)
 Owain Yeoman as General Benedict Arnold (seasons 2–4)
 Nick Westrate as Robert Townsend (recurring season 2, main seasons 3–4)

Recurring cast
 Idara Victor as Abigail, code named Agent 355
 Darren Alford as Cicero
 Andrew McKeough as John Carter
 Talmadge Ragan as Woman in Crowd	
 Dylan Saunders as Joseph Sturridge (season 1)
 Robert Beitzel as Selah B. Strong (seasons 1, 4)
 Jonny Coyne as Colonel Jonathan Cooke (seasons 1, 3–4)
 Brian T. Finney as General Charles Lee (seasons 1–2)
 David Furr as Walter Havens (seasons 1, 4)
 Michael Gaston as General Charles Scott (season 1)
 Amy Gumenick as Philomena Cheer (season 1, season 3–4)
 Jamie Harris as John Robeson (seasons 1–3)
 Aldis Hodge as Jordan/Akinbode (seasons 1–2, 4)
 Thomas Keegan as Ensign Baker (season 1)
 Alex Miller as Colonel Joseph Reed (seasons 1–2)
 Taylor Roberts as Rachel Clark (seasons 1–2)
 Stephen Root as Nathaniel Sackett (seasons 1–2)
 Gentry White as William Lee (seasons 2–3)
 John Billingsley as Samuel Townsend (seasons 2–3)
 Ralph Brown as General Henry Clinton (seasons 2–4)
 Stuart Greer as Officer Yates (season 2)
 Josh Price as Freddy Morgan (seasons 2–4)
 Brian Wiles as Marquis de Lafayette (seasons 2–4)
 Lilli Birdsell as Martha Washington (seasons 3–4)
 John Carroll Lynch as James Rivington (seasons 3–4)
 Sean Haggerty as Colonel Alexander Hamilton (seasons 3–4)
 Adam J. Harrington as Lieutenant Gamble (seasons 2–3)
 Edward Akrout as Amos Parker (season 4)
 Kelly AuCoin as Hercules Mulligan (season 4)
 Chris Webster as John Champe (season 4)
 Mark Halpern as Lieutenant Appleton (seasons 1, 4)
 Laura Meakin as Hesther Carney (season 4)
 Ashley Smith as Lieutenant/Captain Wakefield (Seasons 1-4)

Episodes

Production
Turn: Washington's Spies was renewed for a second 10-episode season on June 23, 2014, which premiered on April 13, 2015, and for a third 10-episode season on July 15, 2015, which premiered on April 25, 2016. On July 26, 2016, Turn: Washington's Spies was renewed for a fourth and final 10-episode season, which had a two-hour premiere on June 17, 2017.

Reception

Critical response 

The first season of Turn: Washington's Spies received mixed reviews. Review aggregator Rotten Tomatoes rated the season 54%, based on 39 reviews, with an average rating of 6.30/10. The site's consensus reads, "Turns uneven treatment of the American Revolution is more frustrating than exciting and memorable." On Metacritic, the first season scored 62 out of 100, based on reviews from 35 critics, indicating "generally favorable reviews".

The second season received positive reviews. On Rotten Tomatoes, the season has an approval rating of 90%, based on 10 reviews, with an average rating of 7.40/10. The website's critics consensus reads: "The revolution gains steam in an improved second season that delivers on the series' promise of espionage thrills along with an expanded historical grandeur." On Metacritic, the season has a weighted average score of 68 out of 100, based on reviews from 4 critics, indicating "generally favorable reviews".

On Rotten Tomatoes, the third season has a rating of 100%, based on 5 reviews, with an average rating of 8.00/10 and the fourth season has a rating of 80% based on 5 reviews, with an average rating of 7.60/10.

Awards and nominations

The first season of TURN: Washington's Spies was awarded the 2014 Media & Entertainment Award by the Daughters of the American Revolution.

Home media
The first season of TURN: Washington's Spies was released on DVD and Blu-ray on March 17, 2015; it became available on Netflix on March 25, 2015. The second season was released on DVD on March 22, 2016 and became available on Netflix on April 11, 2016. The third season was released on DVD on November 8, 2016. and became available on Netflix on June 4, 2017. The fourth season became available on Netflix on December 1, 2017. The series departed Netflix after four years in December 2021. The fourth season still has not been released on DVD and Blu-ray. A Complete Series (Season 1-4) boxset has yet to be released in the US.

Comics
On March 26, 2014, AMC released the digital comic TURN: Origins, illustrated by Steve Ellis, that portrays childhood and adulthood events from the lives of several of the series' main characters, including Abraham Woodhull, Benjamin Tallmadge, Anna Strong, and Caleb Brewster.

On April 10 and April 15, 2015, AMC released the first and second chapters, respectively, of a second digital comic, TURN: Rivals, that portrays the past rivalry of George Washington and Robert Rogers.

See also
 List of television series and miniseries about the American Revolution
 List of films about the American Revolution

References

External links
 
 Comics series:
 
 
 
 

2010s American drama television series
2014 American television series debuts
2017 American television series endings
American biographical series
AMC (TV channel) original programming
Cultural depictions of George Washington
Cultural depictions of Gilbert du Motier, Marquis de Lafayette
Cultural depictions of Benedict Arnold
English-language television shows
Espionage television series
Historical television series
Serial drama television series
Television shows based on books
Television series about the American Revolution
Television series based on actual events
Television series set in the 18th century
Television shows set in Connecticut
Television shows set in Fairfax County, Virginia
Television shows set in New Jersey
Television shows set in New York City
Television shows set in Pennsylvania
Television shows set in Virginia
Television shows filmed in Virginia